Narvagandub Dummad is an island off the northeast coast of Panama. The Spanish colonizers called this island, Naranjos Grandes or Big Orange Trees. The island is part of the chain of islands named San Blas Islands, which stretches from the east of the Panama Canal up to border of Colombia. The archipelago is inhabited by the Guna people, a Native American ethnic group that resides in border areas of Panama and northern Colombia. Their language is part of the Chibchan language family

Demographics

Based from the latest census is 2010, the estimated population of Narvagandub Dummad is 528.

See also
 List of islands by population density

References 

Populated places in Guna Yala
Caribbean islands of Panama